Kusnul Yuli (born July 13, 1978 in Malang, East Java) is an Indonesian footballer who currently plays for Arema FC in the Indonesia Super League.

References

External links

1978 births
Association football defenders
Living people
Indonesian footballers
Liga 1 (Indonesia) players
Persik Kediri players
Arema F.C. players
Sportspeople from Malang